The following is a list of ice hockey teams in Newfoundland and Labrador, past and present. It includes the league(s) they play for, and championships won.

Minor professional

American Hockey League

ECHL

Junior

Quebec Major Junior Hockey League

St. John's Junior Hockey League (Junior "B")

Central/West Junior Hockey League (Junior "B")

Semi-professional, senior and amateur

Senior

Newfoundland West Coast Senior Hockey League

Avalon East Senior Hockey League

League, regional and national championships

See also

Herder Memorial Trophy
Hockey Newfoundland and Labrador

Newfoundland and Labrador teams

Ice hockey
Ice hockey teams in Newfoundland and Labrador